James Rexilius (April 23, 1932 – June 25, 2003) was an American football coach.  He was one of the more prominent and successful coaches in the Chicago area during his career.  In 1992, he was inducted into the Illinois High School Football Coaches Hall of Fame.

Coaching career

High school
Rexilius spent most of his career as the coach at Wheaton North High School where he coached high school football and other sports.  In his 27-year coaching career, Rexilius twice led his high-school teams to state championships—first in 1979 and again in 1986 after returning to the secondary-school level.  When he retired as head coach, his overall high school record was 177 wins and 77 losses.  It was at Wheaton North that he mentored a young Chuck Long toward a career in coaching.

Wheaton
Rexilius was head football coach at Wheaton College  in Wheaton, Illinois for the 1981 season, compiling a record of 2–7.

References

1932 births
2003 deaths
Wheaton Thunder football coaches
High school football coaches in Illinois